Stephen Edward Blaire (December 22, 1941 – June 18, 2019) was an American prelate of the Roman Catholic Church. He was the fifth Bishop of Stockton from March 16, 1999, until January 23, 2018.

Biography

Early life 
Stephen Edward Blaire was born in Los Angeles, California, as the twelfth of fourteen children. He attended local Catholic schools in the San Fernando Valley, and graduated from Our Lady Queen of Angels Seminary (high school) in 1959. Blaire then entered St. John's Seminary College in Camarillo.

Priesthood 
He was ordained to the priesthood for the Archdiocese of Los Angelese by Cardinal James McIntyre on April 29, 1967, and then served as associate pastor of St. Luke's Parish in Temple City, California, until 1972.

From 1972 to 1986, Blaire worked in Catholic secondary education, initially as a teacher and administrator at Bishop Alemany High School in Mission Hills, California and later as vice principal at Bishop Amat High School in La Puente, California. He was principal at Bishop Alemany from 1977 to 1986. He then became curial moderator and chancellor of the archdiocese.

Auxiliary Bishop of Los Angeles 
On February 17, 1990, Blaire was appointed auxiliary bishop of the Archdiocese of Los Angeles and titular bishop of Lamzella by Pope John Paul II. He received his episcopal consecration on May 31, 1990, from Archbishop Roger Mahony, with Bishops John Ward and George Ziemann serving as co-consecrators. Blaire was made vicar general of Los Angeles in 1990 and assigned to Our Lady of the Angels Pastoral Region in 1995.

Bishop of Stockton 
Blaire was named the fifth bishop of the Diocese Stockton on January 18, 1999, and was installed on March 16, 1999, in the Cathedral of the Annunciation.

Within the United States Conference of Catholic Bishops (USCCB), Blaire was chair of the Committee on Domestic Justice and Human Development, having formerly chaired the Pastoral Practices Committee and been a member of the Committee on Ecumenical and Interreligious Affairs. Within the California Catholic Conference, he was chair of the Legislation and Public Policy Committee, as well as a member of the Religious Liberty Committee. He also served on the Ad Hoc Committee on Ecumenical affairs.

In 2001, Blaire learned of allegations that Oscar Pelaez, a priest of the diocese, had molested a 14-year-old boy at Sacred Heart Church in Turlock, California, in 1997. Blaire suspended Pelaez but did not report the incident.  Blaire indicated thatbecause the person alleging the abuse was now an adult and declined to report it, responsibility for reporting it did not rest with the diocese. Blaire said his critics "made an issue about not reporting. We had no legal obligation to report."

In November 2007, Blaire was defeated in his bid to win the chair of the USCCB Committee for the Protection of Children and Young People.

In June 2012, Blaire, as chair of the USCCB Committee on Domestic Justice and Human Development, announced organization's proposal to draft a message entitled Catholic Reflections on Work, Poverty and a Broken Economy.

In May, 2013, the University of San Francisco awarded Blaire an honorary degree and he was the commencement speaker at the graduation ceremony for the Graduate Students in the College of Arts and Sciences.

Retirement and legacy 
On January 23, 2018, Pope Francis accepted Blaire's resignation as bishop of the Diocese of Stockton.  Stephen Blaire died on June 18, 2019, in Modesto, California.

Viewpoints

Capital punishment 
Citing his opposition to capital punishment, Blaire made this statement in 2013:"We must lift up the dignity of all human life – even for those convicted of the worst crimes, and work to transformour culture so that it respects the inherent dignity and value of all people,"

Social justice 
In a 2013 letter to the US House of Representatives, Blaire said that budget cuts to human services should be evaluated on three criteria:

 .Whether it protects or threatens human life and dignity
 How it affects “the least of these” (Matthew 25): 
 The needs of those who are hungry and homeless, without work or in poverty should come first.

See also
 

 Catholic Church hierarchy
 Catholic Church in the United States
 Historical list of the Catholic bishops of the United States
 List of Catholic bishops of the United States
 Lists of patriarchs, archbishops, and bishops

References

External links

Roman Catholic Diocese of Stockton Official Site
; discusses an August 2011 Labor Day statement by Bishop Blaire in his new role as USCCB Chairman on the Committee for Domestic Justice and Human Development, on the link to today's workforce and Pope Leo XIII's landmark 1891 encyclical on capital and the value of labor "Rerum novarum" ("On New Things").

Episcopal succession

1941 births
2019 deaths
People from Los Angeles
Roman Catholic Archdiocese of Los Angeles
Roman Catholic bishops of Stockton
20th-century Roman Catholic bishops in the United States
21st-century Roman Catholic bishops in the United States